Leonard M. "Len" Pomata (born November 6, 1945) is a former Virginia Secretary of Technology. He was appointed by Governor Tim Kaine following the resignation of Aneesh Chopra to become Chief Technology Officer of the United States in 2009. He received a B.S. degree in electrical engineering from the Brooklyn Polytechnic Institute (now part of the New York University Tandon School of Engineering) and a master's degree from NYU. He was controversially made the state's interim Chief Information Officer, head of the Virginia Information Technologies Agency after incumbent Lemuel Stewart, Jr. was ousted over a contract dispute.

References

Living people
State cabinet secretaries of Virginia
New York University alumni
1945 births
21st-century American politicians